The 2011 American Handball Men's Youth Championships took place in Balneário Camboriú from April 13 – 17. It acts as the Pan American qualifying tournament for the 2010 Summer Youth Olympics.

Results

Final standing

References 

2010 in handball
Pan American Men's Youth Handball Championship
2010 in Brazilian sport